Dr. Patient is a 2009 Malayalam film by Viswananathan starring Jayasurya, Mukesh and Radha Varma. Production controller Sanjay padiyoor

Plot 
The movie is set against a mental hospital where Dr. Ruben Isaac comes to work as a doctor. He uses humanitarian considerations to treat his patients, whom he calls as his "clients".

Rakhi Devadas with a hospital management degree from U.S. is the managing director of this hospital. Her strict ways in dealing with patients often creates clashes with the new doctor. Ruben Isaac, meanwhile shows love and care and offers more freedom to the inmates which the M.D. does not like. The movie takes a turn with the arrival of another person, claiming that he is the original doctor.

Cast 
Jayasurya as Dr. Ruben Isaac(Fake)/Babu
Mukesh as Dr. Ruben Isaac
Radha Varma as Rakhi Devadas, MD of the hospital
Manikuttan as Rafeeque
Kulappulli Leela as Kathrina
Mala Aravindan as Thankachan
Jagathy Sreekumar as Poduval
Bijukuttan as Sajan
Anoop Chandran as Kunjoonju
Maniyanpilla Raju as Shankaran
Suraj Venjaramoodu as Eenashoo 
Manikandan Pattambi 
Indulekha
Bose Venkat

Soundtrack
 Mazha Njanarinjirunnilla - Hariharan

Reception 

Sify.com wrote "Even when the end titles roll, you may still have no idea about what the director was trying to say, in Dr.Patient? Just don't bother, it's a farcical exercise, as you will soon realize. Better, go for a walk and forget this horrible experience as a bad dream!" Paresh C Palicha from Rediff.com wrote "Jayasurya after doing a couple of intense roles in the past few months returns to doing senseless comedy. Radha Varma has nothing special to offer and is mediocre to say the least. That leaves the comedians led by Jagathy Sreekumar, Suraj Venjaramoodu, Anoop Chandran, Bijukuttan and others to entertain us, which they fail to do due to lack of cohesiveness and purpose. In final analysis, Doctor Patient drives viewers crazy"

References

External links 
 

2009 films
2000s Malayalam-language films
Films scored by Bennet Veetraag